Beckersville is a  rural village located in the western portion of  Robeson Township, in Berks County, Pennsylvania, United States. The village sits upon Pennsylvania Route 10, and  next to Interstate 176, which spans from Morgantown to northeastern Cumru Township, just outside Reading. The Twin Valley School District serves the community.

The town was named after Joseph Becker, a German carpenter, who built and ran a hotel in the settlement in 1827.

References

External links

Unincorporated communities in Berks County, Pennsylvania
Unincorporated communities in Pennsylvania